The Pangwala is a tribal community predominant in the Pangi valley of Chamba district in Himachal Pradesh.

Social status
, the Pangwalas were classified as a Scheduled Tribe under the Indian government's reservation program of positive discrimination.

Language 
The native language of Pangwalas is Pangwali.

References

Scheduled Tribes of Himachal Pradesh